Myx is a music channel in the Philippines that shows different music videos, domestically and internationally. Every week, its MYX Hit Chart presents the Top 20 most requested music videos voted by people on their website.

Chart history

Chart history of Myx International Top 20

See also 
 2017 in Philippine music
Myx Music Awards 2017

References

External links

2017 in the Philippines
Myx
Philippine record charts